Maya Learned (born 1 January 1996) is an American rugby union player. She plays at Prop for the United States internationally and for Gloucester-Hartpury in the Premier 15s.

Rugby career
Learned was a High School and Junior All-American, she later played for Harvard University. She is proficient on both sides of the scrum and has also played Lock for the Glendale Merlins.

Learned made her international debut for the United States against Canada on November 2019. She signed with Gloucester-Hartpury in 2021. She later extended her contract to the 2022–2023 Premier 15s season.

In June 2022, Learned was named in the Eagles squad for the Pacific Four Series in New Zealand. She came off the bench and featured in all three matches against Canada, Australia, and New Zealand. She was selected in the Eagles squad for the delayed 2021 Rugby World Cup in New Zealand.

References

External links 

 Eagles Profile

Living people
1996 births
Female rugby union players
American female rugby union players
United States women's international rugby union players
Harvard Crimson rugby players